Suché is a village and municipality in Michalovce District in the Kosice Region of eastern Slovakia.

Geography
The village lies at an altitude of 142 metres and covers an area of 7.303 km².
It has a population of about 425 people.

Ethnicity
The population is about 99% Slovak in ethnicity.

Culture
The village has a small public library and a football pitch.

Gallery

External links

http://www.statistics.sk/mosmis/eng/run.html

Villages and municipalities in Michalovce District